Juan García de Loaysa y Mendoza (1478 in Talavera de la Reina, near Toledo, Spain – 22 April 1546 in Madrid, Spain) was a Spanish Archbishop of Seville and Cardinal.

Biography
His parents were nobles; at a very early age he entered the Dominican convent at Salamanca. Its severe discipline, however, affected his delicate constitution and he was transferred to the convent of St. Paul in Peñafiel where he was professed in 1495.

On the completion of his studies in Alcalá, and later at the Colegio de San Gregorio of Valladolid University, he taught philosophy and theology. About the same time he was appointed regent of studies and for two terms filled the office of rector in San Gregorio College. In 1518 he represented his province at the general chapter held at Rome where by unanimous vote he gained the generalship of the Dominican Order in succession to Cardinal Cajetan, a position he held until 1524.

After visiting the Dominican houses in Sicily and other countries, he returned to Spain. There he made the acquaintance of Charles V of Spain who chose him for his confessor and later, with papal sanction, offered him the See of Osma, for which he was consecrated on 8 June 1524. Subsequently, he held several offices of political importance, such as President of the American Council of the Indies. In that capacity he was a proponent of the Dominican line of thought and the New Laws of 1542 protecting the Native Americans; they were however revoked in 1545.

On 16 May 1530 Pope Clement VII created him cardinal and transferred him to the See of Sigüenza, where he became Bishop of Sigüenza on 23 February 1532. He was made Archbishop of Seville on 23 May 1539, and became Grand Inquisitor in 1546, the year of his death.

Legacy
His writings are limited to a few pastoral letters. G. Haine found, in the royal library at Simancas, Garcia's letters to Charles V written in the years 1530–32, of interest for the history of the Protestant Reformation as well as for the religious and political history of Spain during that period.

References
www.catholic-hierarchy.org.
Correspondence with king Charles V, Holy Roman Emperor: in "Colección de documentos inéditos para la historia de España, vol. XIV, pp. 5–284".

Notes

1478 births
1546 deaths
People from the Province of Toledo
Roman Catholic archbishops of Seville
16th-century Spanish cardinals
Bishops of Osma
Bishops of Sigüenza
Spanish Dominicans
16th-century Roman Catholic archbishops in Spain
Grand Inquisitors of Spain
Masters of the Order of Preachers
Dominican cardinals